Osca or OSCA may refer to:
O.S.C.A., a brand of Italian sports cars
Oberlin Student Cooperative Association, a non-profit student cooperative at Oberlin College
Huesca or Osca, a city in Spain
Huéscar, Granada or Osca, a municipality in Spain
Osca (fly), a genus of horse-fly
"OSCA" (song), by Japanese band Tokyo Jihen, from the album Variety (2007)
 Office of Strategic Crime Assessments, former Australian government agency, precursor to Australian Criminal Intelligence Commission

See also
 Oscan language